Icepick is an American metalcore band formed in 1996. It serves as a side project to Jamey Jasta of Hatebreed, Danny Diablo, and other musicians of the hardcore punk and hip hop scenes. Although founded in 1996, Icepick remained virtually stagnant until the song "Born to Crush You" appeared on UFC: Ultimate Beat Downs, Vol. 1 in August 2004. Former UFC heavyweight champion Andrei Arlovski frequently uses their song "Onward to Victory" as his entrance music for fights.

Icepick's debut album, Violent Epiphany, was released on April 18, 2006, under Jasta's record label, Stillborn Records. It features guest vocals by musicians including Ice-T, Roger Miret, Freddy Cricien, Al Barr, Paul Bearer of Sheer Terror, and Pete Morcey of 100 Demons. Wrote Allmusic, the album "is exactly what you'd expect from a Jasta-Ezec union -- spit-flying, angsty hollering and riffs that alternate between ragingly fast and grindingly slow."

Band members
 Jamey Jasta – vocals
 Danny Diablo – vocals
 Wayne Lozinak – lead guitar
 Frank Novinec – rhythm guitar
 Derek Kerswill – drums

Discography
 Violent Epiphany (2006)

References

External links

Metalcore musical groups from Connecticut
Hardcore punk groups from Connecticut
Heavy metal musical groups from Connecticut
Musical groups established in 1996
Musical quartets